Simon’s Sircus was an aerobatics display team comprising six Sea Vixen FAW2 aircraft from 892 Naval Air Squadron of the British Royal Navy's Fleet Air Arm.  The team operated during the summer of 1968 and was named after 892 Squadron’s commanding officer at the time, Lt Cdr Simon Idiens RN.

History
Simon’s Sircus was formed in April 1968 by Lt Cdr Idiens following 892 Squadron’s disembarkation from the aircraft carrier HMS Hermes.  They were based at RNAS Yeovilton and displayed at numerous RAF Airshows and Royal Navy Air Station Air Days during the 1968 season culminating in the SBAC Farnborough Airshow on 20, 21 and 22 September.  The main element of the team’s display began with a steep turn and then a loop in ‘broad arrow’ formation, changing to ‘box six’ during the second manoeuvre.  This was followed by a barrel roll in ‘long arrow’ formation, a loop in ‘spearhead’ formation and lastly a ‘bomb burst’ and finale.  The team were highly acclaimed by many who saw them display, due in no small part to the fact that the Sea Vixens used were over five times heavier than the Folland Gnats used by the well known Red Arrows aerobatic team of the RAF.

Following the conclusion of the Farnborough displays Simon’s Sircus and 892 Squadron were officially disbanded.

References
The de Havilland Sea Vixen by Tony Buttler AMRAeS, (Air Britain)

External links
Simon’s Sircus page at Sea Vixen.org 
Brief history and photographs of Simon’s Sircus 
Pathé News clip of new lion mascot for fleet air arm acrobatic team 'Simon's Sircus'
Farnborough 1968 Simon's Sircus

British aerobatic teams
Fleet Air Arm
Military units and formations established in 1968